The great Matheson Fire was a deadly forest fire that passed through the region surrounding the communities of Black River-Matheson and Iroquois Falls, Ontario, Canada, on July 29, 1916.

As was common practice at the time, settlers cleared land using the slash-and-burn method. That summer, there was little rain, and the forests and underbrush burned easily. In the days leading up to July 29, several smaller fires that had been purposely set merged into a single large firestorm. The fire moved uncontrollably upon the towns of Porquis Junction, Iroquois Falls, Kelso, Nushka, Matheson, and Ramore, destroying them completely and causing extensive damage to Homer and Monteith. A separate fire burned in and around Cochrane.

Because of forest fire smoke that had covered the region for several weeks and the absence of a forest fire monitoring service, there was almost no warning that the conflagration was upon the communities. Some people escaped on the Temiskaming and Northern Ontario Railway (now the Ontario Northland Railway), while others were saved by wading into the nearby Black River or one of the small lakes in the area. 223 people were killed according to the official estimate.

The Matheson Fire led to the creation of the Forest Protection Branch of the Department of Lands, Forests, and Mines (now known as the Ministry of Natural Resources and Forestry) and the Forest Fires Prevention Act in Ontario.

The great fires are the subject of the books Killer in the Bush by Michael Barnes, and Il pleuvait des oiseaux by Jocelyne Saucier.

Historical plaque
An Ontario Heritage Foundation historical plaque stands in Alarie Park near Matheson and reads:

See also
List of fires in Canada

References

1916
Natural disasters in Ontario
1916 in Ontario
1916 fires in North America
1910s wildfires
1916 disasters in Canada